Diving competitions at the 2019 Military World Games were held in Wuhan, China from 24 to 27 October 2019.

Medal summary

Medalists

Men's events

Women's events

Medal standings

References

External links
Results book

2019 in Chinese sport
Military World Games
Diving
2019
Diving competitions in China
International aquatics competitions hosted by China